Carl Ludwig Wimmel (23 January 1786 – 16 February 1845) was a German architect and Hamburg's first building director. His classicist buildings had a decisive influence on the cityscape of Hamburg in the 19th century; his best-known surviving buildings include the Hamburg Stock Exchange and the hospital in St. Georg.

Biography

Wimmel was born the son of a stonemason. Early on he came into contact with architects and sculptors such as Karl Friedrich Schinkel, Christian Daniel Rauch and Johann Gottfried Schadow. Wimmel initially trained as a carpenter. From 1807 he took part in free courses of the Patriotic Society to further his education. He received a scholarship which enabled him to study at the École polytechnique in Paris. After completing his studies in 1810, he travelled through Italy for four years. There he studied the architecture of antiquity and the Renaissance and made numerous sketches and studies.

In 1815 he won the tender for the construction of a hospital in the district of St. Georg, Hamburg. In 1816 he joined the civil service and realised numerous public buildings, which still characterise the cityscape today. After he was financially secured by the public office, he soon acquired Hamburg citizenship. He married Johanna Juliana Sophie Frercks, the daughter of a Hamburg notary. The couple had seven children. After a reform of the municipal building administration, he was appointed Hamburg's first building director. Wimmel died in 1845. Many of his buildings fell victim to the Great Fire of 1842, were demolished, or destroyed in the Second World War.

A collective tombstone in the area of the Old Hamburg Memorial Cemetery on the Ohlsdorf Cemetery commemorates important architects, including Wimmel.

Notable works
 1815: Monument of the expelled Hamburgers
 1817: Dammtor
 1818: Steintor and Alte Wache in St. Georg
 1819: Guardhouse at Millerntor
 1819–1820: St. Pauli Church
 1820–1823: General hospital St. Georg
 1826–1827: City theatre on Dammtorstraße (today Hamburg State Opera)
 1827: Lombard Bridge
 1834–1837: St. Johannis Monastery
 1837–1840: Johanneum at the Domplatz
 1837–1841: Hamburg Stock Exchange (with Franz Gustav Forsmann)
 1840–1841: Schlachthof Hamburg

Gallery

References

19th-century German architects
German urban planners
1786 births
1845 deaths